Second-seeded Sarah Palfrey Cooke defeated first-seeded Pauline Betz 3–6, 8–6, 6–4 in the final to win the women's singles tennis title at the 1945 U.S. National Championships.

Seeds
The eight seeded U.S. players are listed below. Sarah Palfrey Cooke is the champion; others show in brackets the round in which they were eliminated.

  Pauline Betz (finalist)
  Sarah Palfrey Cooke (champion)
  Margaret Osborne (quarterfinals)
  Louise Brough (semifinals)
  Patricia Todd (quarterfinals)
  Mary Arnold (quarterfinals)
  Dorothy Bundy (quarterfinals)
  Doris Hart (semifinals)

One foreign player was seeded.

  Mary Terán de Weiss (second round)

Draw

Final eight

References

1945
1945 in women's tennis
1945 in American women's sports
Women's Singles